Minor Counties South played in List A cricket matches between 1972 and 1979. This is a list of the players who appeared in those matches.

Andrew Barker (1972–1973): AH Barker
Terry Barwell (1972): TI Barwell
Raymond Bond (1973–1974): RE Bond
Alan Burridge (1975): AJ Burridge
Brian Collins (1973–1979): BG Collins
Francis Collyer (1972–1979): FE Collyer
Richard Cooper (1975): RC Cooper
David Daniels (1972): DM Daniels
Micky Dunn (1973): MT Dunn
Malcolm Dunstan (1979): MST Dunstan
Keith Edwards (1973–1974): JKS Edwards
Alan Garofall (1972–1974): AR Garofall
Michael Gear (1973): ME Gear
Peter Gooch (1979): PA Gooch
Richard Gulliver (1979): RJ Gulliver
Richard Hayward (1979): RE Hayward
Bob Herman (1979): RS Herman
Basil Hollington (1972–1974): HB Hollington
Geoff Hunter (1972): CMG Hunter
Ray Hutchison (1974–1975): RW Hutchison
Brian Jeffries (1974–1975): BR Jeffries
Robin Johns (1979): RL Johns
David Johnston (1975): D Johnston
Gwynne Jones (1975): GA Jones
Keith Jones (1975): KV Jones
David Laitt (1972–1973): DJ Laitt
Richard Lewis (1979): RV Lewis
David Light (1974): DG Light
David Mackintosh (1973): DS Mackintosh
Barrie Matthews (1974): BL Matthews
Michael Mence (1973–1975): MD Mence
James Merryweather (1972): JH Merryweather
Timothy Murrills (1979): TJ Murrills
Mike Nurton (1974–1979): MD Nurton
Wayne Osman (1979): WM Osman
David Ottley (1979): DG Ottley
Christopher Payne (1975): CJ Payne
Roger Pearman (1973): R Pearman
Brian Poll (1972): BW Poll
Bob Pomphrey (1979): RH Pomphrey
Giles Ridley (1972): GNS Ridley
Brian Roe (1973): B Roe
Trevor Rosier (1973): TK Rosier
Jack Smith (1973): J Smith
Bill Smith (1972): WA Smith
Jim Standen (1972): JA Standen
Colin Tibbett (1979): CJ Tibbett
Ray Tolchard (1979): RC Tolchard
John Turner (1972–1975): JB Turner
Michael Wagstaffe (1974): MC Wagstaffe
Tony Warrington (1973–1975): AG Warrington
Brian White (1972–1974): BH White
Doug Yeabsley (1972–1979): DI Yeabsley

References

List
Minor Counties of English and Welsh cricket